is a Japanese footballer who plays as a forward for Albirex Niigata.

Club career
Oya made his professional debut in a 4–1 Emperor's Cup match against Zweigen Kanazawa.

Career statistics

Club

References

External links

2004 births
Living people
Japanese footballers
Association football forwards
Albirex Niigata players